Bryant High School may refer to:
William Cullen Bryant High School (New York City)
Bryant High School (Arkansas)